"", also known as "Hei Konei Ra (Farewell)" on its original release, is a song by Pātea Māori Club. Originally written in sessions with Ngoi Pēwhairangi and Dalvanius Prime in Tokomaru Bay in 1982, it was released as their third single in late 1984 or early 1985, prior to the band's tour of the United Kingdom. The song peaked at number 21 in New Zealand, and was later included in their 1987 debut album Poi E.

Background and composition

The song was written in Tokomaru Bay in 1982, when Dalvanius Prime visited the house of lyricist Ngoi Pēwhairangi. In a single day, the pair had created "Poi E", "Aku Raukura" and "Hei Konei Rā". The lyrics are written as a lament for the loss of the old ways.

The song was recorded as a ballad backed by string and synthesiser arrangement, featuring Dalvanius on lead vocals and the Samoan New Zealander vocal trio The Yandall Sisters on backing vocals. "Hei Konei Rā" was first found on a Pātea Māori Club release as a B-side on the "Aku Raukura" single released earlier in the year, where it appeared as a part of a live medley.

The song was released as a single in December 1984. In mid-January, the song debuted at number 21 on the Official New Zealand Music Chart, spending four weeks in the top 30 singles, and a total of eight weeks charting in the top 50 singles. However, by late July the single peaked at number 10. This was released just prior to the club's global tour, which they left for on 15 January 1985.

As the song primarily features vocals from Dalvanius, it made an appearance on the 2003 retrospective album A Man of Passion, released after Dalvanius passed away in October 2002. It was also featured on the compilation album Waiata 2: Maori Showbands, Balladeers & Pop Stars in 2013.

Track listing

NZ 7-inch single
"Hei Konei Ra (Farewell)"  – 3:05
"He Honore Karoria (The Honour & Glory)"  – 2:25

Credits and personnel
Credits adapted from the Poi E album booklet.

Dave Hurley – engineering, co-production
Gordon Joll – drums
Stuart Pearce – keyboard, additional arrangement
Ngoi Pēwhairangi – songwriting
Dalvanius Prime – arrangement, lead vocals, producer, songwriting
Addelle Yandall – additional vocals
Mary Yandall – additional vocals
Pauline Yandall – additional vocals

Charts

References

New Zealand songs
1984 singles
1984 songs
Māori-language songs
Pātea Māori Club songs
Songs written by Ngoi Pēwhairangi
Song recordings produced by Dalvanius Prime